Stanhopea stevensonii is a species of orchid endemic to Colombia (Meta).

References

External links 

stevensonii
Endemic orchids of Colombia
Flora of Meta Department